Entitativity is the perception of a social unit as a "group" (Blanchard et al, 2020; Campbell, 1958; Lickel et al, 2000). For example, one may pass by a bus stop and perceive a group of people waiting for a bus but the same people sitting around a table together at a cafe, sharing pastries, and interacting would be much "groupier." Entitativity is the variance of a person's perception of not very much a group (the bus stop) to very much a group (the cafe).  Entitativity is necessary for people to experience outcomes (e.g., satisfaction) and enact group processes (e.g., conflict resolution). For example, bus stop satisfaction is not as common of a concern for social and organizational psychologists as social group or workgroup satisfaction.  Entitativity is highest for intimacy groups, such as the family, lower for task groups, lower yet for social categories (e.g., people of the same religion), and lowest for transitory groups, such as people waiting at the same bus stop (Lickel et al., 2000). Lickel and colleagues further examined ratings of group entitativity to determine that sports fans, families, and rock bands have the highest entitativity; juries, student study groups, and coworkers have a moderate amount of entitativity; and citizens of a country, professional groups, and people waiting for a bus stop have the lowest levels of entitativity. 

Donald T. Campbell (1958) coined the term entitativity in order to explain why some groups are considered real groups while others are thought to be mere aggregates of individuals. He suggested that people rely on certain perceptual cues as they intuitively determine which aggregations of individuals are groups, and which are not (e.g. Spectators at a football game may seem like a disorganized collection of people, but when they shout the same cheers or express similar emotions, this gives them entitativity; Forsyth, 2010). Campbell (1958) emphasized three cues that individuals can use to make judgments regarding entitativity: common fate (the extent to which individuals in the aggregate seem to experience interrelated outcomes), similarity (the extent to which the individuals display the same behaviors or resemble one another), and proximity (the distance between individuals in the aggregate). 

When Lickel et al (2000) revitalized the study of entitativity, they identified interaction, importance, goals, outcomes, similarity, duration, permeability, and size as characteristics of people's perceptions of groups. After Lickel et al's work, additional researchers focused primarily on interactivity and similarity as the key characteristics of entitativity  (Crump et al, 2010; Ip, Chiu, & Wan, 2006). Blanchard et al (2020) suggested that these characteristics are actually antecedents of entitativity and developed measures of entitativity, interactivity, similarity of goals, similarity of characteristics, and history of interactions to advance the study of entitativity.  

Outcomes of entitativity include identification with the group, group satisfaction, and group commitment. These outcomes are why entitativity is considered important to group members.  

To illustrate how we make those judgments, consider the example of people sharing a table at a library. They could be friends who are studying together, or they may also be strangers happening to share the same table. If you're wondering whether this is an actual group, you would examine their common fate, similarity, and proximity. Common fate may be something like the group all getting up and leaving together while talking or laughing amongst themselves. Similarity could be as simple as noticing that they are all using the same textbooks or notes, or that they happen to be wearing the same t-shirts to organizations (i.e., fraternity, university group). Finally, their physical proximity to one another (i.e., moving to sit closer) would be the final characteristic to judge that you are witnessing individuals with entitativity (Forsyth, 2010)

See also 
 Collective responsibility
 Collective punishment
 Entity–relationship model
 Legal entity
 Non-physical entity
 Reification (fallacy)

References
Blanchard, A. L., Caudill, L. E., & Walker, L. S. (2020). Developing an entitativity measure and distinguishing it from antecedents and outcomes within online and face-to-face groups. Group Processes and Intergroup Relations, 23(1), 91–108. https://doi.org/10.1177/1368430217743577 
Campbell, D. T. (1958). Common fate, similarity, and other indices of the status of aggregates of persons as social entities. Behavioural Science, 3, 14–25.
Crump, S. A., Hamilton, D. L., Sherman, S. J., Lickel, B., & Thakkar, V. (2010). Group entitativity and similarity : Their differing patterns in perceptions of groups. European Journal of Social Psychology, 1230(December 2009), 1212–1230. https://doi.org/10.1002/ejsp (link) 
Ip, G. W., Chiu, C., & Wan, C. (2006). Birds of a feather and birds flocking together: physical versus behavioral cues may lead to trait- versus goal-based group perception. Journal of Personality and Social Psychology, 90(3), 368–381. https://doi.org/10.1037/0022-3514.90.3.368 
Forsyth, D. R. (2010). Group Dynamics (5th edition). Belmont, CA: Wadsworth. 
Lickel, B., Hamilton, D. L., Sherman, S. J. (2001). Elements of a lay theory of groups: Types of groups, relational styles, and the perception of group entitativity. Personality and Social Psychology Review, 5, 129-140. 
Lickel, B., D. L Hamilton, G. Wieczorkowska, A. Lewis, S. J Sherman, and A. N Uhles. (2000). Varieties of groups and the perception of group entitativity. Journal of Personality and Social Psychology 78, no. 2: 223–246. link to pdf

Perception
Abstraction